Mathias Jørgensen (born 20 September 2000) is a Danish professional footballer who plays as a striker for Danish 2nd Division club Esbjerg fB.

Club career

Youth
Jørgensen began his youth career with local side Hundested before joining the youth squad of  Nordsjælland. On 8 January 2017 he signed with the Odense Boldklub youth squad at the age of 16.
 Jørgensen started to draw the attention of the first team with his play with the U19 squad. On 15 September 2018, he scored four goals with the U19 team in a 4–1 victory over Lyngby. While with OB's U19 team Jørgensen scored 28 goals in 24 matches.

OB
Jørgensen made his professional debut with OB on 18 April 2018 in a 1–1 draw against Randers FC. For the 2018/19 season he was promoted to the first team. He scored his first goal as a professional on 15 July 2018 in a 3–2 loss to Vendsyssel FF.
The following matchday, he also scored in a 2–2 draw against SønderjyskE. On 3 October 2018 Jørgensen scored the second goal for OB in a 2–0 victory over Thisted FC in a Danish Cup match. His play with OB drew the interest of several European clubs, and during January 2019 he joined Borussia Mönchengladbach during training camp in Spain.

New York Red Bulls
On 12 February 2019 it was announced that Jørgensen was transferred to New York Red Bulls for a reported fee of $2.5 million. On 16 March 2019 Jørgensen made his debut for New York, coming on as a late game substitute in a 4-1 victory over San Jose Earthquakes.  Following the 2021 season, New York declined their contract option on Jørgensen.

Loan to AGF
On 8 December 2020, Jørgensen  moved on a 6 month loan to Danish Superliga side AGF. He left the club again at the end of the season.

Esbjerg fB
On 26 January 2022 it was confirmed, that Jørgensen had joined Danish 1st Division club Esbjerg fB on a deal until the end of 2024. He made his debut on 25 February, coming off the bench for Lasha Parunashvili in a 4–2 league loss to Fremad Amager.

International career
Jørgensen was called up to the Denmark national under-18 football team in 2017 and also represented Denmark at the  U-19 level. On 19 November 2018 he scored his first goal for Denmark in a 2–0 victory over Switzerland in a friendly match with the U-19 side.

Career statistics

References

External links
 Mathias Jørgensen at OB
 
 Mathias Jørgensen on DBU

2000 births
Living people
Danish men's footballers
Denmark youth international footballers
Danish expatriate men's footballers
Association football forwards
Odense Boldklub players
People from Hundested
New York Red Bulls players
New York Red Bulls II players
Aarhus Gymnastikforening players
Esbjerg fB players
Danish Superliga players
Danish 1st Division players
Danish 2nd Division players
Major League Soccer players
USL Championship players
Danish expatriate sportspeople in the United States
Expatriate soccer players in the United States
Sportspeople from the Capital Region of Denmark